Nicolaas 'Nico' Godfried van Kampen (June 22, 1921 – October 6, 2013) was a Dutch theoretical physicist, who worked mainly on statistical mechanics and non-equilibrium thermodynamics.

Van Kampen was born in Leiden, and was a nephew of Frits Zernike. He studied physics at Leiden University, where in 1952 under the direction of Hendrik Anthony Kramers he earned his PhD with thesis Contributions to the quantum theory of light scattering. He showed in his thesis how to deal with singularities in quantum mechanical scattering processes, an important step in the development of renormalization, according to Kramers. Van Kampen made fundamental contributions to non-equilibrium processes (in particular on the master equation) and in many-body theory (especially in plasma physics). His work on non-equilibrium processes began in 1953 in the research group of Sybren Ruurds de Groot (the successor to Kramers) in Leiden. In 1955 Van Kampen joined the Institute of Theoretical Physics at Utrecht University, where he later became full professor and professor emeritus after his retirement.

His monograph Stochastic processes in physics and chemistry (1981) is considered a classic. In his 2002 book Waanwetenschap (Science), Van Kampen condemned what he saw as pseudoscience, even within the scientific community; the book met with a mixed reaction—five scientists, including , Floris Takens and Dennis Dieks, wrote a commentary on his book.

Van Kampen was an uncle of the Dutch theoretical physicist and Nobel prize winner Gerard 't Hooft, and encouraged 't Hooft to study physics in Utrecht. Van Kampen was a member of the Royal Netherlands Academy of Arts and Sciences since 1973. He died, aged 92, in Nieuwegein.

Quantum mechanics

Van Kampen was a severe critic of non-orthodox interpretations of quantum mechanics.  Some of his views on this subject were published in his article "The scandal of quantum mechanics". He disclosed his own approach to quantum mechanics in his paper "Ten theorems about quantum mechanical measurements".

Additional works
N. G. van Kampen: Views of a physicist. Selected papers of N. G. van Kampen, World Scientific 2000 (ed. Paul H. E. Meijer)
N. G. van Kampen: Stochastic processes in physics and chemistry, North Holland 1981, 3rd edn., 2007, 
N. G. van Kampen, B. U. Felderhof: Theoretical methods in plasma physics, North Holland 1967, 
N. G. van Kampen: Entropie (in German), Plus Lucis, 1997

References

External links

 

20th-century Dutch physicists
1921 births
People from Leiden
Leiden University alumni
Members of the Royal Netherlands Academy of Arts and Sciences
2013 deaths
Academic staff of Utrecht University
Theoretical physicists
Quantum physicists